The Nederlandsche Cocaïnefabriek (English: Dutch Cocaine Factory) or NCF was an Amsterdam-based company producing cocaine for medical purposes in the 20th century. It imported its raw materials mainly from the Dutch East Indies and sold its products across Europe, making good profits especially in the early years of World War I. The NCF produced morphine, heroin and ephedrine as well.

History
In 1875, the first coca plants were transferred from Brazil to the colonial botanical garden "'s Lands Plantentuin te Buitenzorg" in Java. Shortly after, commercial production started in Java, Madura and Sumatra. Coca leaves were exported, mainly to Germany, through the Koloniale Bank in Amsterdam. This trader of agricultural produce moved between 34 and 81 tons of leaves annually from 1892 to 1900. Because of growing demand and a steady supply the Koloniale Bank decided to start production of cocaine in Amsterdam and it founded the Nederlandsche Cocaïnefabriek 12 March 1900. Production started in a building designed by Herman Hendrik Baanders. The building was expanded in 1902, but in 1909 the factory moved to another location. Cocaine was sold as a medication for a variety of chest and lung ailments, but it was used as a recreational drug as well. The NCF soon became one of the major cocaine producers in Europe.

World War I
At first, the NCF profited from World War I by taking over markets established by German market leader Merck, which was hit by an export ban. A Dutch ban on selling medical supplies to warring parties was enforced, but the NCF got an exemption. The NCF had been selling some of its cocaine to Burroughs Wellcome & Co, which used it in its Forced March, a product that was advertised with: "Allays hunger and prolongs the power of endurance". Cocaine and opium were easily available to soldiers in for instance London's nightlife district of West End, until they were prohibited and brought under the Defence of the Realm Act in 1916. In 1917 unrestricted submarine warfare brought overseas imports virtually to a standstill, affecting the NCF just as well as others.

Controlled substances
Conferences in Shanghai (1909) and The Hague (1912) laid foundations for control of narcotics. In the Dutch Opium Law of 1919 cocaine became a controlled substance. For the NCF this meant it had to get a permit to produce and sell - which it did. In the early 1920s the NCF produced 20% of the world's cocaine.  At the Geneva Convention of 1925 a system of certificates was decided upon, to regulate exports of strictly medical and scientific cocaine only. In the Netherlands, further legal restrictions were imposed in 1928 to limit the selling of cocaine to medical uses. This also affected the NCF, but as not all surrounding countries ratified the decisions of the Convention (immediately), some free sales of cocaine continued. By 1930 however, cocaine had become a marginal product and the NCF was switching to other products.

Later years
In the early 1930s the NCF started to manufacture opiates like morphine and codeine to fill the gap left by the disappearing market for cocaine. The market situation for these products was not positive however, and margins were small. At the outbreak of World War II the NCF saw increased profits on its opiates, because of market shortages. Under German occupation the NCF produced ephedrine, but a lack of raw materials soon affected the company.

After the war production picked up again, with poppy straw imported from Turkey and Yugoslavia to produce morphine and other opiates. In 1962 the company's shares were acquired by KZO. Soon after KZO was able to buy NCF's major Dutch competitor VPF as well. KZO reorganised and merged the production of both, shutting down the Amsterdam facility. In 1975 the Nederlandsche Cocaïnefabriek was renamed to NCF Holding BV, a company held by AkzoNobel.

References

Sources
  (2012), The history of the Nederlandsche Cocaïne Fabriek and its successors as manufacturers of narcotic drugs, analysed from an international perspective, Foot & Playsted Pty.

External links
 Flickr, pictures from a memorial book

Cocaine
Pharmaceutical companies established in 1900
20th century in Amsterdam
Pharmaceutical companies of the Netherlands
Pharmaceutical companies disestablished in 1975
1975 disestablishments in the Netherlands
Dutch companies established in 1900